The DuPage Drones were a summer collegiate baseball team based in Lisle, Illinois. They were a member of the summer collegiate Prospect League. The Drones played at the Village of Lisle-Benedictine University Sports Complex at Benedictine University.

References 

Lisle, Illinois
Amateur baseball teams in Illinois
Prospect League teams
Baseball teams established in 2015
2015 establishments in Illinois
Defunct baseball teams in Illinois
Baseball teams disestablished in 2015